Royce Thomas Carlisle Ryton (16 September 1924 – 14 April 2009) was an English playwright. He was educated at Lancing College. During the war he served in the Royal Navy; afterward, he went to train as an actor at the Webber Douglas Academy of Dramatic Art. As an actor, he played in many repertory theatres, including Bromley, Minehead, and Worthing. He also toured extensively. Over the years he worked less as an actor so he could concentrate on his writing. Initially, he had some success with comedies (which were particularly well received in Germany), but later he became fascinated with the interaction of the private and public lives of royalty and politicians.

He was married to Morar Kennedy (sister of Ludovic Kennedy) from 1955 until his death, aged 84; they have a daughter, Charlotte. Morar has a son, Roderick Orr-Ewing, from her first marriage.

With Crown Matrimonial (1972), Ryton achieved an historical first – the serious portrayal of a living member of the Royal Family (Queen Elizabeth The Queen Mother) on the stage. It is about the Abdication crisis of 1936. The play was Ryton's most successful work and has been performed on Broadway and the London West End. In the West End, the central portrayals of Queen Mary and Edward VIII were played by Wendy Hiller and Peter Barkworth. Most recently Queen Mary was played by Patricia Routledge.

Ryton continued his 'Royal-theme' in 1981 with the comedy (co-written with Ray Cooney), Her Royal Highness, about a double having to stand-in for Lady Diana Spencer when she loses her nerve and disappears, one week before the Royal Wedding. It ran successfully at the Palace Theatre in London's West End from 1981 to 1982.

Bibliography
The Painted Face
Penguins Can't
Enter Mr Johns
Holiday in Spala
The Royal Baccarat Scandal
The Anastasia File
Suez
King Leopold
Your Place or Mine
The King's Grace
Albert the Uncrowned King written with his daughter Charlotte Ryton
Catherine the Queen written with his daughter Charlotte Ryton
Woe to the Sparrows
Queen Victoria's Granddaughters
The Other Side of the Swamp
The Unvarnished Truth
Motherdear
Her Royal Highness
Crown Matrimonial
 The Boy Juliet

References

1924 births
2009 deaths
People educated at Lancing College
Alumni of the Webber Douglas Academy of Dramatic Art
Royal Navy personnel of World War II
English male dramatists and playwrights
20th-century English dramatists and playwrights
20th-century English male writers